Polythlipta macralis is a moth in the family Crambidae. It was described by Julius Lederer in 1863. It is found on Indonesia's Ambon Island, Papua New Guinea and Taiwan.

References

Spilomelinae
Moths described in 1863